Chang Ching-wen is a Taiwanese scientist and public official.

Chang earned a master's of science at National Taiwan University's Institute of Public Health and a doctorate from the Department of Environmental Health at the University of Cincinnati. Upon her return to Taiwan, Chang became a supervisor and director for the Taiwan Occupational Hygiene Association and Taiwan Society of Indoor Environmental Quality. She also held a professorship at NTU.

Chang also worked with several governmental organizations, first as a research fellow affiliated with the Institute of Occupational Safety and Health, a division of the Council of Labor Affairs. She subsequently served on the Infectious Disease Control Board reporting to the Ministry of Health and Welfare, was appointed to the Environmental Protection Agency's Air Pollution Control Fund Management Board, and became a member and deputy minister of the Atomic Energy Council under minister Hsieh Shou-shing. Chang was appointed minister of the Atomic Energy Council in January 2023.

References

Living people
Women government ministers of Taiwan
Academic staff of the National Taiwan University
National Taiwan University alumni
Taiwanese expatriates in the United States
University of Cincinnati alumni
Taiwanese public health doctors
Environmental health practitioners
Taiwanese women physicians
Year of birth missing (living people)